It's a Jungle Out There is the first album by Mastedon, the studio project formed by brothers John & Dino Elefante. It was released in 1989 on Regency Records, while they were setting up their own label "Pakaderm Records". Long out-of-print, it was re-issued by Deep Music Distribution in 2006 in the form of digital downloads, available from iTunes and eMusic, and in 2022, a remastered CD-only release from Girder Music. 

The album was re-issued by Italian label Frontiers Records on November 6, 2009, with three additional tracks: a Mastedon song from 1987's California Metal compilation, "Wasn't It Love", and two live songs from the Cornerstone Festival in 1991, "Islands in the Sky" and "Right Hand".

Track listing

 All songs by John Elefante/Dino Elefante © 1988 Uncle Pitts Music (except for track number 9 / © 1988 Uncle Pitts Music/Petsong Publishing).
 Note: track number 6 is also found on the Christian metal compilation "California Metal Volume II" (1988) on Regency Records as track number 6.
 Note: track number 11 is also available on the Christian metal compilation "Classic Metal" (1990) on the Regency Records label as track number 1 as well as on the Christian metal compilation California Metal.

Musicians
 David Raven - Drums
 Phil Rowland - Drums
 John Elefante - Drums, keyboards
 Dino Elefante - Bass, rhythm guitar
 John Pierce - Bass
 John Patitucci - Fretless bass on "Shine On"
 Jimmy "Flint" Johnson - Bass
 Dave "Pitty" Amato - Lead guitar
 Steff Burnbaum - Lead guitar on "Get Up"

Lead vocals
 John Elefante on "This Is The Day", "Islands In The Sky", "Get Up", bonus tracks
 Dave Amato on "Glorybound", "Right Hand", "Love That Will Survive"
 Perry Lee on "Innocent Girl", "Love Inhalation"
 Dave Robbins on "It's A Jungle Out There"
 Dave Pack (guest vocalist) on "Shine On"

Additional lead vocals
 Coni Gayle, Michelle Lynn on "Shine On"

Background vocals
 John Elefante, Dave Amato, Dino Elefante

Production details
 Executive producers: David Malme and John Moore
 Engineered and mixed by Mike Mireau, John and Dino Elefante
 Additional recording on "Shine On" at "Packs Place"
 Additional engineering: Ben Rodgers
 Assistant engineer: Jeff Simmons
 Mastering at Future Disc: Steve Hall
 Illustration: Robert Fischer

Album notes
 The vocals on this album were processed through the Eventide H-3000SE with special thanks to Gil Griffith
 Perry Lee appears courtesy of Tracer Fox
 This album is dedicated to the legend of "Uncle Pitts" Elefante who brought joy to all our lives.
 The album is also dedicated to Amande Elefante who is recovering from a severe brain aneurysm, thanks to your prayers. 
 Mas'te'don: Any of various, large extinct animals resembling the elephant but larger, much larger 
 "Innocent Girl" was dedicated to Shauna Grant.

References

1989 debut albums
Mastedon albums